Gregory Morava (born February 9, 1959 in Chicago) is an American former handball player who competed in the 1984 Summer Olympics.

References

1959 births
Living people
American male handball players
Olympic handball players of the United States
Handball players at the 1984 Summer Olympics
Sportspeople from Chicago
Medalists at the 1987 Pan American Games
Pan American Games gold medalists for the United States
Pan American Games medalists in handball